An outbreak is a sudden increase in occurrences of a disease in a particular time and place.

Outbreak may also refer to:

Arts and entertainment
Outbreak (band), an American punk band
Outbreak (album), by Outbreak, 2009
Outbreak (DJ) (born 1984), Australian DJ and producer
Outbreak (film), a 1995 American disaster film
Outbreak (novel), a novel by Robin Cook
"Outbreak" (Under the Dome), a television episode
Kaisen: Outbreak, a professional wrestling event
Resident Evil Outbreak, a video game

Other uses
Tornado outbreak

See also

 
 
 Super Outbreak (disambiguation)
 Breakout (disambiguation)
 Break (disambiguation)
 Out (disambiguation)